Eastern Company Sporting Club is an Egyptian football club based in Cairo, Egypt. The club is related to the tobacco company, Eastern Company (El Sharkia Lel Dokhan).

History
The club used to play in the Egyptian Second Division, the second-highest league in the Egyptian football league system. However, Eastern Company were promoted to the 2021–22 Egyptian Premier League for the first time in their history, as they finished top of their group in the 2020–21 Egyptian Second Division.

Current squad

References 

Egyptian Second Division
Football clubs in Cairo
1953 establishments in Egypt
Association football clubs established in 1953